The St. Francis Xavier X-Women ice hockey team plays for St. Francis Xavier University, located in Antigonish, Nova Scotia. The team competes in the Atlantic University Sport (AUS) conference of U Sports where they were an inaugural varsity member of U Sports women's ice hockey in the 1997–98 season. Representing St. Francis Xavier Athletics, the X-Women have won the most AUS championships with 11 conference championship wins, most recently in 2020.

History

2010-11 season
During the 2010–11 season, the X-Women remained undefeated through the AUS regular schedule (24-0) and playoffs (3-0). The team won their first conference title since 2007–08. On March 14, 2011, the X-Women played in the national championship game for the first time. However, the squad was bested by the McGill Martlets in a 5–2 defeat. The silver medal finish is the program's highest in the U Sports women's ice hockey championship tournament.

Recent results
Prior to the 2013–14 season, AUS teams played a round robin tournament with six teams split into two groups (two games played each). The winners of those games played for the AUS championship. Starting in 2013–14, the AUS had teams play three-game series with seeding with the AUS championship also being awarded after a three-game series. Canadian Interuniversity Sport changed its name to U Sports in 2016. With the addition of the UNB Reds for the 2018–19 season, all AUS teams went from playing 24 regular season games to playing 28 games.

The 2019-20 team won the AUS championship after finishing the regular season on a 12-game winning streak and finished 4–0 in the AUS playoffs. In the 2020 national championship, the X-Women were seeded third and defeated the Montreal Carabins in the quarterfinal. However, due to the COVID-19 pandemic in Canada, the remainder of the tournament was cancelled, bringing a halt to a promising finish for the team.

All-time scoring leaders

Awards and honours

U Sports honours
Abygail Laking, 2010 CIS All-Rookie Team
Alex Normore, 2010-11 CIS Rookie of the Year
Alex Normore, 2011 All-CIS Second Team
Alex Normore, 2011 CIS All-Rookie Team
Jenna Pitts, 2011 CIS All-Rookie Team
Alex Normore, 2012 CIS Scoring Champion
Tyra Meropoulis: 2019-20 AUS leader, USports leader: Goals (26)
Tyra Meropoulis: 2019-20 AUS leader, USports leader: Points (37)

All-Canadians
Suzanne Fenerty, 2011 All-CIS First Team
Alex Normore, All-Canadian First Team (2011–12), 2012-13
Suzanne Fenerty, All-Canadian First Team (2011–12)
Tyra Meropoulis: 2019-20 USports First-Team All-Canadian

Brodrick Trophy
From 2017-20, St. FX produced three Brodrick Trophy winners. Sarah Bujold (2016–17) and Daley Oddy (2017-18) represented back-to-back wins while Tyra Meropoulis earned the honour in 2020. The first player in program history to capture the Brodrick Trophy was Brayden Ferguson, reaching the pinnacle in 2007-08.

Brayden Ferguson: 2007-08 USports Brodrick Trophy
Sarah Bujold: 2016-17 USports Brodrick Trophy
Daley Oddy: 2017-18 USports Brodrick Trophy
Tyra Meropoulis: 2019-20 USports Brodrick Trophy

USports nationals
Erin Brophy, 2011 Harrow Player of the Game (awarded to player of the game in the CIS championship)
Carolyn Campbell, 2011 CIS women's ice hockey tournament All-Star selection
Suzanne Fenerty, 2011 CIS women's ice hockey tournament All-Star selection

AUS awards
Tyra Meropoulis: Finalist, 2019-20 AUS Female Athlete of the Year
AUS Most Sportsmanlike Player: Jill Bowie (2003–04), Suzanne Fenerty (2009–10), Taylor Dale (2014–15, 2015–16)
AUS Top Defensive Player: Lydia Schurman (2019–20)
AUS Student-Athlete Community Service Award: Colleen Wall (2004–05) 
AUS Coach of the Year: Frank Isherwood (1999-00, 2000–01), David Synishin (2003–04, 2004–05, 2007–08, 2012-13), Ben Berthiaume (2014–15, 2017–18)

Player of the Year
AUS Most Valuable Player: Brayden Ferguson (2007–08), Alexa Normore (2011–12, 2012–13, 2013–14, 2014–15), Sarah Bujold (2016–17), Daley Oddy (2017–18), Tyra Meropoulis (2019–20)

Rookie of the Year
Emerson Elliott (2017–18)
Alex Normore, (2010–11)
Abygail Laking, (2009–10)
Rebecca Davies, (2003–04)

All-Star selections
First Team
Tyra Meropoulis: 2019-20 AUS First-Team All-Star
Sarah Bujold: 2018-19 AUS First-Team All-Star
Lindsey Donovan: 2018-19 AUS First-Team All-Star
Sarah Bujold: 2017-18 AUS First Team All-Star
Lindsey Donovan: 2017-18 AUS First Team All-Star
Daley Oddy: 2017-18 AUS First Team All-Star
Suzanne Fenerty, 2011 AUS first all-star team
Suzanne Fenerty, 2010 AUS First Team All-Star
Janelle Parent, 2011 AUS First all-star team
Alex Normore, 2011 AUS First all-star team
Marilyn Hay, 2010 AUS First Team All-Star 
Marilyn Hay, 2009 AUS First Team All-Star 
Marilyn Hay, 2008 AUS First Team All-Star 
Marilyn Hay, 2007 AUS First Team All-Star

Second Team
Tyra Meropoulis, 2018-19 AUS Second Team All-Star
Carley Molnar, 2017-18 AUS Second Team All-Star
Marilynn Hay, 2011 AUS Second all-star team
2009-10 AUS Second Team All-Stars: Jessica Shanahan, StFX
2009-10 AUS Second Team All-Stars: Carolyn Campbell, StFX

All-Rookie Team selections
Tyra Meropoulis, 2018–19
Emerson Elliott: 2017-18
Amy Graham: 2017-18
Kristy Garrow, 2010-11 AUS all-rookie team
Alex Normore, 2010-11 AUS all-rookie team

University awards
Suzanne Fenerty, 2011 St. FX Female Athlete of the Year
Suzanne Fenerty, St. FX Female Athlete of the Week (Week of March 14, 2011)

X-Women in professional hockey
Suzanne Fenerty was selected by the Brampton Thunder in the fifth round of the 2012 CWHL Draft, but never appeared with the team.

International
Brayden Ferguson : 2009 Winter Universiade  
Jenna Downey, Defense : 2011 Winter Universiade 
Suzanne Fenerty, Defense : 2011 Winter Universiade 
Alex Normore - StFX : 2015 Winter Universiade 
Daley Oddy, : 2015 Winter Universiade 
Daley Oddy, Forward : 2017 Winter Universiade

References

External links
Official website

St. Francis Xavier University
Ice hockey teams in Nova Scotia
U Sports women's ice hockey teams
Women's ice hockey teams in Canada
Women in Nova Scotia